The Politics of Piedmont, Italy takes place in a framework of a presidential representative democracy, whereby the President of Regional Government is the head of government, and of a pluriform multi-party system. Executive power is exercised by the Regional Government. Legislative power is vested in both the government and the Regional Council.

Executive branch
The Regional Government (Giunta Regionale) is presided by the President of the Region (Presidente della Regione), who is elected for a five-year term and is composed by the President and the Ministers, who are currently 14, including a Vice President (Vice Presidente).

List of presidents

Local government

Provinces

Municipalities

Provincial capitals

Other municipalities with more than 45,000 inhabitants

Legislative branch

The Regional Council of Piedmont (Consiglio Regionale del Piemonte) is composed of 60 members. 48 councilors are elected in provincial constituencies by proportional representation using the largest remainder method with a Droop quota and open lists, while 12 councillors (elected in bloc) come from a "regional list", including the President-elect. One seat is reserved for the candidate who comes second. If a coalition wins more than 50% of the total seats in the council with PR, only 6 candidates from the regional list will be chosen and the number of those elected in provincial constituencies will be 54. If the winning coalition receives less than 40% of votes, special seats are added to the council to ensure a large majority for the President's coalition.

The council is elected for a five-year term, but, if the President suffers a vote of no confidence, resigns or dies, under the simul stabunt, simul cadent clause introduced in 1999 (literally they will stand together or they will fall together), also the council is dissolved and a snap election is called.

Parties and elections

Latest regional election

The latest regional election took place on 26 May 2019. Alberto Cirio of Forza Italia, who was supported also by Lega Nord Piemont (LNP) and other parties, defeated incumbent President Sergio Chiamparino of the Democratic Party. The LNP was by far the largest party.

References

External links
Piedmont Region
Regional Council of Piedmont
Constitution of Piedmont

 
Piedmont